Robbie Deas (born 27 February 2000) is a Scottish professional footballer who plays as a defender for Inverness Caledonian Thistle of the Scottish Championship.

Career

Celtic
Deas signed his first professional contract with Celtic in 2018. He scored the winning goal in stoppage time as Celtic youths beat Rangers 3–2 to lift the Glasgow Cup in May 2019.

Loan moves to Cowdenbeath and Alloa Athletic
On 23 August 2018, Deas joined Scottish League Two club Cowdenbeath on loan for the 2018–19 season. On 9 October 2018, he was named in the SPFL team of the week after a  narrow 1–0 victory over Stirling Albion at Central Park.

On 2 August 2019, Deas moved on loan to Scottish Championship club Alloa Athletic for the 2019–20 season.

Inverness CT
Deas left Celtic after the 2019/20 season and signed a three-year contract with Inverness Caledonian Thistle.

International career
Deas has represented Scotland at the under-17 and under-19 levels.

Deas received a call up to the U-21 squad on 25 May 2021 alongside Inverness teammates Roddy MacGregor, Daniel MacKay and Cameron Harper ahead of two friendlies against Northern Ireland.

Personal life
He is the nephew of former Livingston player Paul Deas.

Career statistics

References

2000 births
Living people
Scottish footballers
Association football defenders
Scotland youth international footballers
Celtic F.C. players
Cowdenbeath F.C. players
Alloa Athletic F.C. players
Scottish Professional Football League players
Inverness Caledonian Thistle F.C. players
Scotland under-21 international footballers